Dove Island may refer to:

Dove Island (Canada), Nunavut Canada
Dove Island (British Columbia), Canada
Dove Island Indian Reserve No. 12, an Indian reserve comprising that island
Dove Island (Guangzhou), an English naming for Guanzhou Island in Guangzhou, Guangdong Province, China. Naming by UK Government.
Dove Island (Saint Vincent and the Grenadines)
Dove Island, Minnesota, an island in Rainy Lake, home to the community of Island View
Dove Island (Western Australia)